Gyan Devi Public School, is an English-medium senior secondary school in Sector-17 A in Gurgaon, Haryana, India. It is a branch in the Gyan Devi Group of Schools made by the chairman and managing director of the school, Mr. Joginder Singh Yadav. It also has Mrs. Neena Yadav as the Principal of the school and Mrs. Kamal Yadav as the Vice-principal.  According to the school, its motto is "Wisdom is Glory", which clearly highlights the mission of the school, i.e. to spread the light of Wisdom.

This school is the oldest and with the largest area branch of Gyan Devi group of schools, all located in Gurgaon, Haryana, India. The group of schools has total four branches, including this one. The other ones are Gyan Devi Montessori School in Sector-9, Gyan Devi School in Sector-10 and Gyan Abhiyan Kendra in Sector-17.

Foundation 
It was founded by the Chairman, Mr. Joginder Singh Yadav in the memory of Lt. Smt. Gyana Devi.

Information 
The school has classes offered from Nursery to 12th class. The school is affiliated to Central Board of Secondary Education. The school is completely English-medium.

House system 

The school follows a house system, as followed in British schools. The school consists of three houses:
 Neeti house (Sky Blue) 
 Keerti house (White) 
 Sfoorti house (Black) 
These words are from the language Hindi. Neeti literally means policy, Keerti means Glory and Sfoorti means Elation.

Functions and events 

There are very functions that take place eventually in the school, like the Independence Day Celebrations, the  Republic Day Celebrations, the Annual Day Function and also many religious festival functions, annually.

Sports and games 

The school provides the students the following sports: -
 Volleyball
 Basketball
 Football
 Badminton
 Handball
 Kho Kho

Athletics 

 Races :- 100 m., 200 m., 400 m.,800 m.,
 Athletic Hurdles and Cross Country .
 Jumps:- Long jump, High jump and Triple jump.
 Throws:- Shot put, Javelin and Discus

Rhythmic exercises 

 Dumb-bells
 Hoopla Drill
 Skipping
 Lazium
 March Past
 Mass PT
 Floor Exercise
 Vaulting Horse
 Gymnastics
 Tug of War
 Flying Disc
 Yoga
 Pranayams.

Other branches 

Other than Gyan Devi Public School, there are three more branches:
 Gyan Devi Montessori School, Sector-9, Gurgaon, Haryana, India
 Gyan Devi Senior Secondar School, Sector-10, Gurgaon, Haryana, India
 Gyan Abhiyan Kendra, Sector-17, Gurgaon, Haryana, India

All of the above branches belong to Mr. Joginder Singh Yadav, who is the chairman and managing director of the group of schools.

References 

High schools and secondary schools in Haryana
Primary schools in India
Schools in Gurgaon